The Khema script, also known as Gurung Khema, Khema Phri, Khema Lipi, is used to write the Gurung language. Khema has been proposed for Unicode encoding as of 2011 and in 2021. The Language Commission of Nepal recognizes Khema as the official script of Gurung.

Usage
Devdaha Mother Tongues Academy, located in Rupandehi teaches Gurung in the Khema script. Khema script is used in Sikkim to officially write Gurung language.

See also
 Gurung language

References

External links
 https://www.unicode.org/L2/L2022/22157-gurung-khema-script.pdf

Writing systems of Nepal
Brahmic scripts